Shoorveer is an Indian Hindi-Language action thriller television series 
created by Samar Khan and directed by Kanishka Varma. It features Regina Cassandra, Armaan Ralhan, Manish Chaudhari, Aadil Khan, Makarand Deshpande, Shivya Pathania and Arif Zakaria in the lead roles  with an ensemble cast. The series is made under the banner of Juggernaut Productions. It is scheduled to release on 15 July 2022 on Disney+ Hotstar.

Cast
Regina Cassandra as Flient Lieutenant Avantika Rao
Armaan Ralhan as Viraj Sehgal, a pilot and Satish's son
Manish Chaudhari as Group Captain Ranjan Malik, head of the Hawks program
Aadil Khan as Squadron Leader Salim Kamali, Preeti's love interest
Makarand Deshpande as NSA Milind Phanse
Shivya Pathania as Preeti Sood, Salim's love interest
Arif Zakaria as Pakistan General Riaz Ahmed
Abhishek Saha
Harman Singha as Dev, Viraj's friend
Jiten Lalwani as Shekhar Sen
Mohit Chauhan as PM Chandrashekhar Pratap
Amit Behl as Satish Barot, Viraj's estranged father
Preeti Gupta as Roma Sood
Kashmira Irani as Sarah, Sidhesh's partner
Anjali Barot as Manju Thapliyal
Kuldeep Sareen as Jaspreet Bhatti
Faisal Rashid as ISI agent Sidhesh Vakharia
Sahil Mehta as Captain Perry Mehta
Roopa Divatia as Salon's mother

References

External links 
 
 Shoorveer at Hotstar

Indian action television series
2022 Indian television series debuts